The St Augustin Basilica is a Catholic basilica and pro-cathedral located in Annaba, Algeria. It is dedicated to Saint Augustine of Hippo.

History 
Construction of the basilica began in 1881 and finished on March 29, 1900, led by  Abbe Pougnet. The church was dedicated  April 24, 1914 and dedicated to  Saint Augustine of Hippo.  It was built not far from the remains of the Basilica Pacis built by Saint Augustine, where he died while the city was besieged by Vandals. The statue of St. Augustine in the basilica contains one of his arm bones. It is under the circumscription of the Diocese of Constantine.

Architecture 
The Basilica was built with Stones imported from France. Its Carrara marble, breathtaking stained glass and massive arches depict  Roman, Byzantine and Arab architecture style influences.

External links
GCatholic.org
Lonely Planet
Images of the Basilica of St Augustin in Manar al-Athar digital heritage and photo archive

References 
 

Buildings and structures in Annaba
Basilica churches in Algeria
Roman Catholic churches completed in 1900
19th-century Roman Catholic church buildings in Algeria
Catholic Church in Algeria
Roman Catholic cathedrals in Algeria
Tourist attractions in Annaba Province
20th-century Roman Catholic church buildings in Algeria